Les Misérables: The Dream Cast in Concert (1995), also titled Les Misérables in Concert, is a concert version of the 1980 musical Les Misérables, which was based on Victor Hugo's 1862 novel, produced to celebrate the 10th anniversary of the West End production. It was filmed in October 1995 at the Royal Albert Hall and released on DVD, VHS and LD in 1998, and re-released on DVD in North America in 2008. The latest DVD presents the concert in its original 16x9 ratio.

Although filmed with HD cameras, a Blu-ray edition has not been released yet. The 10th Anniversary cast stars Colm Wilkinson as Jean Valjean, Philip Quast as Inspector Javert, Michael Ball as Marius Pontmercy, Lea Salonga as Éponine, Judy Kuhn as Cosette, Ruthie Henshall as Fantine, Michael Maguire as Enjolras, Alun Armstrong as Thénardier, Jenny Galloway as Madame Thénardier, Adam Searles as Gavroche, Hannah Chick as Young Cosette, and several others, and was directed by John Caird. The performers were chosen from the London, Broadway and Australian productions of the show and the Royal Philharmonic Orchestra was conducted by David Charles Abell. It also aired on PBS part of the Great Performances series.

Production
The 10th anniversary concert of Les Misérables is known as the "Dream Cast in Concert" because Mackintosh hand-selected the cast. Colm Wilkinson reprised his role as Valjean after starring in the original West End and Broadway productions. Philip Quast was cast as Inspector Javert after the producers of the show witnessed his performance in a musical production in his hometown in Australia. Wilkinson and Quast are widely recognized as the "Dream Casting" of the idolized roles of Valjean and Javert.  Lea Salonga is the only non-Caucasian performer in the main cast. Her participation has been credited by many stage musical enthusiasts of breaking down racial barriers for future castings of the live show.

This presentation uses a "modernised" and more heavily orchestrated score than that of the original musical. It follows the traditional "musicals-in-concert" format with the cast lined up against a set of microphones with the orchestra and chorus behind them. The entire company wear costumes and use only necessary props (such as Javert's baton, Thénardier's notebook, etc.). Apart from minor movement on the concert stage, the performers do not participate in major action scenes. Where necessary, the video switches to action from the stage production.

A few action-based scenes from the musical are not included in the concert – such as the street brawl broken up by Javert, Gavroche's death, and the confrontation between Marius and Thénardier at the wedding feast. Some musical numbers, such as "At the End of the Day", "Lovely Ladies", "The Runaway Cart", "In My Life", and "Turning" were also shortened.

Notable events 
During the performance of "Castle on a Cloud", as Hannah Chick sang the line "Crying at all is not allowed", a loud pop was heard – the popping of a balloon, one of many stored in the ceiling for release at the end of the show. It visibly startled her (as seen by her sudden flinch), but she recovered immediately and continued the song with no delay in the delivery.

The five international English-speaking Valjeans featured in the encore song played the convicts in the opening number "Look Down".

Encore
The programme ends with an encore in which seventeen international actors who portray Jean Valjean in their respective countries join Wilkinson on stage to each sing a few bars of "Do You Hear the People Sing?" in their native languages. They are then joined by the entire cast and choir to sing the last verse of "One Day More", receiving a standing ovation. Red, white, and blue balloons, as well as confetti, fall from the ceiling; sparklers erupt on stage as the show finishes.

Cast

Main performers

The seventeen Valjeans
The following are the seventeen Valjeans who participated in the second encore (in order):

Cavill and Leyton also appeared as two of the five principal convicts in "Look Down" at the beginning of Act 1.

DVD release
The DVD was released by Sony Pictures on 17 November 1998. This Region 1 fullscreen DVD is now out of print. It has a run time of 159 minutes.

A two-disc widescreen collector's edition was released by BBC Video in Region 1 territories on 19 February 2008. Viewers have reported that a segment of "Little People" is inexplicably removed. This release also does not contain the speeches. The second disc contains Les Misérables: Stage by Stage, a documentary from 1989.

Recent versions of the DVD include the missing segment of Little People.

A remastered special edition DVD of the concert was released on November 20, 2012.

Soundtrack
Disc 1
 Prologue (Look Down)
 On Parole/The Bishop
 Valjean's Soliloquy
 At the End of the Day
 I Dreamed a Dream
 Lovely Ladies
 Fantine's Arrest
 The Runaway Cart
 Who Am I? - The Trial
 Fantine's Death
 The Confrontation
 Castle on a Cloud
 Master of the House
 The Bargain-Waltz of Treachery
 Look Down
 Stars
 ABC Café/Red and Black
 Do You Hear the People Sing?
 Rue Plumet - In My Life
 A Heart Full of LoveDisc 2
 The Attack on Rue Plumet
 One Day More!
 Building the Barricade/On My Own
 Back at the Barricade
 Javert's Arrival/Little People
 A Little Fall of Rain
 Night of Anguish
 First Attack
 Drink with Me
 Bring Him Home
 Second Attack/The Final Battle
 The Sewers
 Dog Eats Dog
 Javert's Suicide
 Turning
 Empty Chairs at Empty Tables
 Every Day/A Heart Full of Love (Reprise)
 The Wedding Chorale/Beggars at the Feast
 Epilogue (Finale)
 Encore 1: Entrance of International Valjeans
 Encore 2: Do You Hear the People Sing?/One Day More!

See also 
 Les Misérables (musical)
 Les Misérables in Concert: The 25th Anniversary (2010)
 Les Misérables: The Staged Concert (2019)
 Adaptations of Les Misérables

References

External links
 

1998 films
Films based on Les Misérables
Concert films
Cantatas
French films based on plays
British films based on plays
British musical films
Cast recordings
Concerts at the Royal Albert Hall
1998 soundtrack albums
Concert film soundtracks
Theatre soundtracks
Films based on adaptations
Films based on multiple works
1990s English-language films
1990s British films